The largest tornado outbreak on record to occur during the month of January struck the Midwestern and Southern United States between January 21–23, 1999. The outbreak mostly took place across the Mississippi River Valley. Over the course of roughly two days, 127 tornadoes touched down across the region, resulting in widespread damage. Nine people were killed by the tornadoes. The outbreak is best known for an F3 that struck Little Rock, Arkansas, killing three people.


Meteorological synopsis
On January 21, the Storm Prediction Center (SPC) issued a High risk of severe weather across much of central and eastern Arkansas, southwestern Tennessee, northeastern Louisiana, and much of northern and western Mississippi. The organization warned of the potential for a widespread severe weather outbreak, including several long-tracked and intense tornadoes. The meteorological setup unfolded as a broad upper-level trough, with its axis across the Central United States, rapidly amplified in conjunction with a 175 mph (280 km/h) jet streak across the southern Rockies. Substantial height falls—implying cooling in the mid layers of the atmosphere—coupled with the sharpening trough allowed for strong divergence to overspread the highest risk area. At the surface, a deepening area of low pressure initially centered near the Texas–Oklahoma border early on January 21 deepened and accelerated eastward, reaching the Arkansas–Missouri border during the overnight hours. A dry line extended southward across eastern Texas, providing increased mechanisms for rising air as it combined with a cold front and pushed eastward into Arkansas.

As the upper-level trough rapidly intensified, 500mb winds increased to 70–80 mph (110–130 km/h) and 850mb winds topped 70 mph (110 km/h) across the High risk area. The combination of speed shear and adequate directional shear (noted by curved low-level hodographs) led to 0–3 km storm relative helicities of 300–500 m2/s2, favorable for rotating thunderstorms. A capping inversion, qualified by cold and dry air aloft, initially prevented the formation of thunderstorms and instead allowed substantial surface heating. Surface-based CAPE values of 1500–2000 j/kg and most unstable CAPE values of 1000–2000 j/kg became prevalent across the broad warm sector. Low-level moisture transported northward from the Gulf of Mexico resulted in dewpoints in the low- to mid-60s °F by the afternoon hours. With continually strengthening wind fields, the capping inversion steadily weakened, and several tornadic supercells formed across Arkansas. In addition to the tornado outbreak, steep 850–500mb lapse rates, ranging from 6.5 to 7.5 c/km, contributed to a favorable environment for gigantic hail and widespread damaging winds. Nine reports of hail over 2.51 in (6.38 cm) were received by the SPC.

Confirmed tornadoes

January 21 event

January 22 event

January 23 event

Little Rock, Arkansas tornadoes

The Little Rock area was slammed by a strong tornado on the evening of January 21. The tornado began in Saline County south of Vimy Ridge at 6:24 pm CST (0024 UTC). Before crossing the Pulaski County line, it did moderate damage to several houses and significant damage to a mobile home. It crossed into Pulaski County at 6:33 pm, where moderate roof damage was reported to several buildings along the Interstate 30 corridor. It continued eastward and did most of its devastation just south of the downtown area.

There was severe damage reported to over 235 buildings, many of which were destroyed. One of the destroyed buildings included a large grocery store, a Harvest Foods, where one person was killed. Over 500 other buildings sustained lesser damage. Some of the houses damaged that were in the historic district were also condemned due to there being lead smelt beneath them. Trees and power lines were also knocked down throughout the area. Damage was also reported on the property of the Arkansas Governor's Mansion, where many trees were knocked down. As the tornado left the downtown vicinity, it weakened as it crossed Interstate 40. It lifted in the northeastern suburbs, near Sherwood at 6:53 pm CST, after being on the ground for 29 minutes and travelling 22 miles (35 km). The first tornado was rated F3 on the Fujita scale

As the first tornado dissipated, a second tornado, rated F2, developed in eastern Pulaski County. While it remained in more rural settings, it also destroyed several buildings, including a storage facility. It also knocked over several tractor-trailers before crossing into Lonoke County. Extensive damage was also reported in Lonoke County, where the South Bend community was hit hard. 12 houses, 11 mobile homes and several farm buildings were damaged or destroyed in Lonoke County. The tornado dissipated at 7:02 pm CST (0102 UTC) southwest of Cabot.

Three people died in the tornadoes (all due to the first F3). One of them was in the destroyed grocery store, another was in a vehicle hit by a tree, and the third was in a mobile home that was destroyed. 78 other people were injured by the tornado.

See also
List of North American tornadoes and tornado outbreaks
January 17–18, 1999 tornado outbreak
1999 Oklahoma tornado outbreak

References

F4 tornadoes by date
Tornadoes of 1999
Tornadoes in Arkansas
Tornadoes in Tennessee
1999 in Arkansas
1999 in Tennessee
1999 natural disasters in the United States
Tornado outbreak